Carnicer Torrejón Fútbol Sala was a futsal club based in Torrejón de Ardoz, city in the autonomous community of Community of Madrid.

The club was founded in 1985 and its arena is Pabellón Jorge Garbajosa with capacity of 4,500 seaters.

History
Before 2012–13 season, the club was excluded of Primera División due to failing to meet the financial criteria of LNFS being relegated next season to Segunda División.

In June 2013, the team was relegated another division for failing to meet financial criteria of LNFS, dropping to Segunda División B. 

In May 2014, the club was closed down due to little support received from the public and private institutions.

Season to season

15 seasons in Primera División
3 seasons in Segunda División
2 seasons in Segunda División B
1 seasons in Tercera División

Notable former players
 Juanra
 Carlitos Ortiz
 Chechu Herrero
 Leitão

References

Externan link
Official website

Futsal clubs in Spain
Sports teams in the Community of Madrid
Futsal clubs established in 1985
Sports clubs disestablished in 2014
1985 establishments in Spain
Sport in Torrejón de Ardoz